Oktiabrske (until 1945, Büyük Onlar) is an urban-type settlement in the Krasnohvardiiske Raion (district) of the Autonomous Republic of Crimea, a territory incorporated by Russia as the Republic of Crimea. As of the 2001 Ukrainian Census, its population is 10,910. Current population:

See also
 Krasnohvardiiske, the other urban-type settlement in Krasnohvardiiske Raion of Crimea

References

Urban-type settlements in Crimea
Krasnohvardiiske Raion